Pir Morad (also Romanized as Pīr Morād and Pīrmorād) is a village in Rowzeh Chay Rural District, in the Central District of Urmia County, West Azerbaijan Province, Iran. At the 2006 census, its population was 154, in 43 families.

References 

Populated places in Urmia County